L'eroe della strada (i.e. "The hero of the road") is a 1948 Italian comedy film directed by Carlo Borghesio and starring Erminio Macario.

Plot
Felice Manetti, a  poor, unemployed man, is accused of stealing an organ. Saved by the testimony of Gaetano, a con man who pretends to be a former partisan, then Felice falls in love with a cigarette girl whose husband went missing in war.

Cast 

Erminio Macario as Felice Manetti
Carlo Ninchi as Gaetano Salvatore
Delia Scala as Giulietta Marchi
Folco Lulli as Head of the Workers
Piero Lulli as Paolo 
 Monica Egg as  Paulette Jones
 Cesare Costarelli 	 as Comm. Zanotti 
 Carlo Rizzo as Political Agitator
Arnoldo Foà as Prosecutor

References

External links

Italian comedy films
1948 comedy films
1948 films
Films directed by Carlo Borghesio
Films scored by Nino Rota
Italian black-and-white films
1940s Italian films
1940s Italian-language films